Naya Mahisagar is an Indian drama television series which premiered on 22 February 2016 on BIG Magic and ended on 8 August 2016 with 119 episodes. The series is produced by Hats Off Productions. It stars Dharti Bhatt and Sandit Tiwari in the lead roles. She plays a character of Mahi.

Seasons

Plot
After a month, Mahi and Sagar return from Mahi's village- Verakhadi, Anusuya becomes upset as Mahi brings Anusuya's mother-in-law's statue back from a garbage dump which initially was as at a crematorium which she herself insisted for with a smiling face and describing  जिंदगी के आखरी स्टेशन पर भी हस्ते हुवे जाना चाहिए .

After a series of events, Mahi learns about the presence of DadiSaas's entity in house. Initially, she scared about this thing and called for help but all   in the family called her mentally ill. Eventually, Mahi and DadiSaas became friends. DadiSaas always made antics to trouble Anusuya but ending Mahi in trouble. DadiSaas always tricks Chandraguta (God who keeps tracks of the dead) into stealing any of his tools.

DadiSaas always make fun of Anusuya and ends up landing Mahi in trouble. Once, a demoness pairs up with Anusuya (hypnotized) and tries to teach DadiSaas a lesson. This makes all the members of house a non-living thing. Finally Lord Shiv comes to the rescue but instead takes DadiSaas away from Mahi forever.
Hence, Mahi and DadiSaas are separated.

Cast

Main
Dharti Bhatt as Mahi
Pranoti Pradhan as Anusuya Mehta
Sandit Tiwari as Sagar Mehta
Ketki Dave as Dadi Saas (dead)
Apara Mehta later replaced Ketki Dave

Recurring
Ankur Malhotra as Rohit Mehta
Namrata Dhameja as Soniya

Production

Development
Owing to the popularity of the previous season Mahisagar, which was made over 400 episodes, this sequel titled Naya Mahisagar was launched. The genre of the prequel was family-comedy but the sequel was planned as supernatural-comedy. The sequel of the show didn't garner much ratings as expected.

Casting
Dharti Bhatt reprised her role as Mahi Sagar Mehta, Sandit Tiwari reprised his role of Sagar Mehta. Vandana Pathak was replaced by Pranoti Pradhan as Anusuya Mehta and her character was made negative. Ketki Dave was cast as DadinSaas who was later replaced by Apara Mehta. Ankur Malhotra and Namrata Dhameja returned for their role of Rohit Mehta and Soniya Rohit Mehta. Bawarchi Kanhiyalal was replaced with Pauna Bhaiya.

Cancellation
Due to low response towards its supernatural genre, the show was pre-maturely cancelled on 8 August 2016

References

Big Magic original programming
Hats Off Productions
2016 Indian television series debuts
2016 Indian television series endings